Polyfothine is an anticholinergic alkaloid.

References

Anticholinergic alkaloids
Methoxy compounds
Nitrogen heterocycles
Heterocyclic compounds with 3 rings
Ketones